Triptow is a surname. Notable people with the surname include:

Dick Triptow (1922–2015), American basketball player and coach
Robert Triptow (born 1952), American writer and artist